Metropolitan John (secular name Fatmir Pelushi; January 1, 1956, in Tirana) is the Albanian Orthodox metropolitan of Korça, since his installment in 1999.

In 1979, he was secretly baptized by a priest named Fr. Kozma Qirjo with name in honor of St. John the Theologian.

After graduating from Holy Cross Seminary with a Master's of Theological Studies, he returned to Albania and Archbishop Anastasios appointed him to teach theology at the seminary, as well as serve in other capacities within the Church.

February 27, 1994 Archbishop Anastasios ordained him as a deacon on then as a priest on December 4 the same year.

He received a scholarship from him and returned to the United States to pursue further studies. After return in 1996, he was appointed as director of the seminary as well as elevated as an archimandrite on November 19.

On July 18, 1999, he was elected as Metropolitan of Korça and enthroned two days later.

References 

Bishops of the Albanian Orthodox Church
1956 births
Living people
Converts to Eastern Orthodoxy
People from Tirana